German submarine U-277 was a Type VIIC U-boat of Nazi Germany's Kriegsmarine during World War II.

The submarine was laid down on 3 March 1942 at the Bremer Vulkan yard at Bremen-Vegesack as yard number 42. She was launched on 7 November 1942 and commissioned on 21 December under the command of Oberleutnant zur See Robert Lübsen.

Design
German Type VIIC submarines were preceded by the shorter Type VIIB submarines. U-277 had a displacement of  when at the surface and  while submerged. She had two shafts and two  propellers.

U-277 was fitted with five  torpedo tubes (four fitted at the bow and one at the stern), fourteen torpedoes, one  SK C/35 naval gun, 220 rounds, and two twin  C/30 anti-aircraft guns. The boat had a complement of between forty-four and sixty.

Service history
U-274 served with the 8th U-boat Flotilla for training from December 1942 to May 1943 and operationally with the 6th U-boat Flotilla from 1 June. She carried out six patrols, but sank no ships. She was a member of six wolfpacks.

She carried out a short voyage between Kiel in Germany and Bergen in Norway over June 1943.

First patrol
The boat departed Bergen on 29 June 1943 and docked at Hammerfest via Bear Island on 17 August.

Second patrol
For her second sortie, U-277 departed Hammerfest on 29 August 1943. Her route took her as far north as Svalbard before arriving at Narvik on 10 October.

Third and fourth patrols
The boat's third patrol took her round Bear Island, but was otherwise uneventful.

Her fourth foray was followed by a series of short 'hops' between Hammerfest, Narvik, Trondheim and Bergen. During one of them, she ran aground and had to be towed off the offending rocks. The damage caused forced an immediate return to base.

Fifth and sixth patrols and loss
Her penultimate, official patrol was between Narvik and Hammerfest.

She left Hammerfest for the last time on 11 April 1944. She was sunk southwest of Bear Island by depth charges dropped from a Fairey Swordfish of No. 842 Squadron, Fleet Air Arm on 1 May. The aircraft had come from the carrier .

Fifty men died; there were no survivors.

Wolfpacks
U-277 took part in six wolfpacks, namely:
 Monsun (30 August – 7 October 1943)
 Monsun (17 – 23 November 1943)
 Eisenbart (23 November – 21 December 1943)
 Blitz (25 March – 4 April 1944)
 Donner (11 – 20 April 1944)
 Donner & Keil (20 April – 1 May 1944)

References

Bibliography

External links

German Type VIIC submarines
U-boats commissioned in 1942
U-boats sunk in 1943
U-boats sunk by British aircraft
Indian Ocean U-Boats
World War II submarines of Germany
World War II shipwrecks in the Arctic Ocean
1942 ships
Ships built in Bremen (state)
U-boats sunk by depth charges
Ships lost with all hands
Maritime incidents in May 1944